Till is unsorted glacial sediment.

Till may also refer to:

Agriculture
 Tillage, a broad type of soil preparation
 Till (seed), sesame seeds

Artificial objects
 Till (furniture), a small compartment or shelf inside a blanket chest
 Till, or cash register, a machine for calculating and recording transactions
the checkout or point of sale area of a shop (in colloquial metonymy)

Arts and entertainment
 Till (film), 2022 American film about Mamie Till-Mobley
 "Till" (song), a song recorded by Roger Williams, The Angels, and The Vogues, among others
 Till (The Vogues  album), 1969
 Till (Roger Williams album)
"Till... (Ballad Unit)", a 2019 song by Pentagon from Genie:us

People
Till (surname), list of people with the surname
Till Eulenspiegel, Middle Low German folklore figure
Till Lindemann (born 1963), lead vocalist of German industrial metal band Rammstein

Rivers in England
River Till, Lincolnshire
River Till, Northumberland
River Till, Wiltshire

See also

Tell (disambiguation)
Til (disambiguation)
Tull (disambiguation)
Until (disambiguation)